Legatiriff Halt railway station is a disused railway station located near Ballinderry, County Antrim, Northern Ireland. Open in 1936 it was found on the Lisburn-Antrim line which had opened much earlier in 1871. The station was simple with a wooden platform and an old carriage as a waiting room. The station closed in 1960, on the same day as passenger services ended as a whole, although passenger services on the line ran again from 1974 to 2003. The station has since been demolished.

References

Disused railway stations in County Antrim
Railway stations opened in 1936
Railway stations closed in 1960
1936 establishments in Ireland
1960 disestablishments in Northern Ireland
Railway stations in Northern Ireland opened in the 20th century